Bheekara Nimishangal is a 1970 Indian Malayalam film,  directed by M. Krishnan Nair and produced by P. Arunachalam. The film stars Sathyan, Madhu, Sheela and Adoor Bhasi in the lead roles. The film had a musical score by M. S. Baburaj. The film was a remake of the Tamil film Naanal.

Cast

Sathyan as Mancheri Raghavan
Madhu as Inspector Venu
Sheela as Savithry
Adoor Bhasi as Ranger James
T. S. Muthaiah as Vikraman Thampi
Sankaradi
Bahadoor
N. Govindankutty as Velu
Paravoor Bharathan
Ushakumari as Indira
Vincent as Murali
Khadeeja
Abbas
Baby Savitha
Geetha
Kuttan Pillai
Hema

Soundtrack
The music was composed by MS Baburaj and the lyrics were written by Vayalar Ramavarma.

References

External links
 

1970 films
1970s Malayalam-language films
Malayalam remakes of Tamil films
Films directed by M. Krishnan Nair